Emery is a ghost town in Dover Township, Fulton County, Ohio, near present-day Tedrow, Ohio.

History
On July 11, 1846, Amos Gay, as the first postmaster, opened the Emery post office.  It closed January 23, 1861, but reopened later that year on May 23, with William Waid serving as the postmaster. It remained open until August 31, 1903.

A letter from the Civil War era, dated from 1861 and addressed to the Emery Post office, preserved in the Searls Family Papers, is held at Bowling Green State University at the Center for Archival Collections.

Emery is listed in an 1860 business directory, and in an 1870 Post Office directory.

Will and Emma Knapp are listed as residents of Emery, Ohio in a family genealogical record.

Emery also made its way on an 1898 Ohio railroad map, (albeit mistakenly in the place of Spring Hill, apparently a mistake of the mapmaker. Also, the newly mapped railroad, which runs northly from Wauseon towards Oakshade, mistakenly jogs east towards a station at Ottokee, drawn in the actual location of Winameg.)

Geography
It was located only a short distance from Spring Hill, about 1.5 miles southwest. There are no remaining structures of the town.  The Ancestry website states that it was located in the "northwest one-quarter of the southwest one-quarter of Section 4" of Dover Township, which would place it near County Road H (formerly West Unity-Swanton Road) between County Road 17 (formerly Hartman-Inlet Road) and County Road 16 (formerly Lena-Morenci Road).  According to the Fulton County Plat Directory, this places Emery possibly in the path of, or just north of, the Ohio Turnpike.

Gallery

References

External links
 Fulton County Historical Society

Unincorporated communities in Fulton County, Ohio
Unincorporated communities in Ohio